Melaleuca depressa is a plant in the myrtle family, Myrtaceae and is endemic to the south-west of Western Australia. It is a small, bushy shrub with clusters of yellow or cream flowers on the ends of its branches in spring.

Description
The leaf stalk is very short and the end is pointed but not sharp.

The flower are a shade of cream to yellow and are arranged in heads on the ends of branches which continue to grow after flowering, or sometimes in the upper leaf axils. Each head has between 2 and 6 groups of flowers in threes. The stamens are arranged in five bundles around the flower, each bundle containing 9 to 13 stamens.

Taxonomy and naming
Melaleuca depressa was first formally described in 1904 by Ludwig Diels in Botanische jahrbucher fur systematik, pflanzengeschichte und pflanzengeographie under the heading Fragmenta Phytographiae Australiae occidentalis:Beitrage zur Kenntnis der Pflanzen Westaustraliens, ihrer Verbreitung und ihrer Lebensverhaltnisse ("Contributions to the knowledge of the plants of West Australia, where they are found and their conditions of existence"). The specific epithet (depressa) is from the Latin depressus meaning "flattened from above, somewhat sunken at the centre", although it is not clear why Diels chose this epithet.

Distribution and habitat
Melaleuca depressa occurs in the Geraldton and Northampton districts in the Avon Wheatbelt and Geraldton Sandplains biogeographic regions. It grows in sandy soils over sandstone and limestone.

Conservation status
This species is classified as "not threatened" by the Government of Western Australia Department of Parks and Wildlife.

References

depressa
Myrtales of Australia
Plants described in 1904
Endemic flora of Western Australia
Taxa named by Ludwig Diels